Ammerthal is a municipality in the district of Amberg-Sulzbach in Bavaria in Germany.

Sport
The town's association football club DJK Ammerthal, formed in 1958, experienced its greatest success in 2012 when it won promotion to the Bayernliga for the first time.

References

Amberg-Sulzbach